Amatongaland, or Tongaland, was a district of Zululand, located in the far north of the Zulu territory, bordered on the west by the Lebombo Mountains. The district comprised 1280 mi2 (2060 km2). The inhabitants were the Amatonga sub-group of the Zulu people.

The possession of Tongaland was strongly desired by the Boers since it would furnish them an outlet to the Indian Ocean. In order to disrupt that plan Great Britain placed Tongaland under British protection on 11 June 1895, annexed to Zululand on 27 December 1897, and then promptly annexed to Natal along with Zululand the same year.

References

British Empire
History of South Africa
1897 in England